Anoop Lather is a Haryanvi film actor. He appeared in several Haryanvi films, including  Chandrawal.

Filmography
Lather is most known for playing Lado Basant, Chanderiya in the movie Chandrawal.

References 

Indian male film actors
Male actors from Haryana
Living people
Year of birth missing (living people)